Phoenix Wright: Ace Attorney Trilogy  (initially published as Phoenix Wright: Ace Attorney Trilogy HD on mobile devices) is a compilation video game containing remasters of the first 3 games in the Ace Attorney series, Phoenix Wright: Ace Attorney, Justice for All, and Trials and Tribulations.

Development 
A high-definition version of the first three Ace Attorney games, Phoenix Wright: Ace Attorney Trilogy HD, was released for iOS and Android in Japan on February 7, 2012, and for iOS in the West on May 30, 2013. This legacy mobile version has since been delisted, being replaced by the Phoenix Wright: Ace Attorney Trilogy release on iOS and Android on June 10, 2022.

Phoenix Wright: Ace Attorney Trilogy, was first released for the Nintendo 3DS in Japan on April 17, 2014, in North America on December 9, 2014, and in Europe on December 11, 2014. It was also released for Nintendo Switch, PlayStation 4, and Xbox One on February 21, 2019 in Japan, and on April 9, 2019 internationally; a Windows version was released internationally on the same date.

The Ace Attorney Trilogy home console releases were first announced in an interview with news website Jiji in 2017, Capcom's COO, Haruhiro Tsujimoto, said that the Ace Attorney series was going to receive support on the Nintendo Switch, with a mainline entry, and two compilations, one of the original trilogy and one including games 4 through 6 in the series.

The game was later revealed at the Ace Attorney panel at Tokyo Games Show 2018. The trailer used in the convention was later uploaded in English on September 22, 2018, and a pre-order was made available for the game on Nintendo Switch in January 2017 exclusively in Japan, and a Steam pre-order was later made available on February 28, 2019.

Prior to its English release, a listing for the game was put up on the Australian Nintendo Switch eShop, the content of which made people believe the game was going to be releasing in English-speaking territories on April 9, 2019, which ended up being 5 days off.

On August 24, 2019, the option to play the game in French, German, Korean, Simplified Chinese, and Traditional Chinese was added per language. The update also added additional save files.

The French-language version of the game accidentally forgot to remove a mention of the WiiWare controls that were in the Wii port of Phoenix Wright: Ace Attorney – Trials and Tribulations.

Downloadable content 
The mobile versions of Phoenix Wright: Ace Attorney Trilogy feature the first two cases, The First Turnabout and Turnabout Sisters, free, however, the user needs to purchase the rest of the cases.

For the PlayStation 4 release of Phoenix Wright: Ace Attorney Trilogy, two sets of user profile pictures were purchasable for $1.99, one named the Phoenix Set and one named the Edgeworth Set.

Soundtrack 

On February 21, 2019, a music album titled Phoenix Wright: Ace Attorney Trilogy - Turnabout Tunes was released on Steam which included some of the music used in the game and some original tracks created specifically for the album. The album was also included in the Japanese collector's edition of the game.

Reception

Phoenix Wright: Ace Attorney Trilogy was met with positive reviews from critics, receiving scores through 78 to 81 on review aggregator Metacritic.

The game's graphics were heavily praised for being HD while the legacy mobile releases were heavily criticized for poor graphics and low frame rate. IGN criticized the latest releases graphics were polished to "the point of being overly sterile", citing that evidence sometimes lacks more details than the original releases.

Crunchyroll's Daniel Dockery stated that the game was one of his favorite Nintendo 3DS games.

Sales 
On June 13, 2020, Phoenix Wright: Ace Attorney Trilogy was the 23rd most-sold digital-only game on the Nintendo Switch in North America. The game outperformed its sales goals by 150% in the first month of its release.

On February 5, 2021, Capcom announced that the sales for the Nintendo Switch, PlayStation 4 and Steam have surpassed one million units.

As of December 31, 2022, the game has sold 1.90 million copies worldwide.

Notes

References

External links 
 

2012 video games
Ace Attorney video games
Android (operating system) games
Capcom games
Capcom video game compilations
IOS games
Nintendo 3DS games
Nintendo Switch games
PlayStation 4 games
Single-player video games
Trilogies
Video games developed in Japan
Windows games
Xbox One games